Audley Fleming Mahaffey (December 19, 1899 – March 1982) was an American politician in the state of Washington. He served in the Washington House of Representatives from 1945 to 1949 and 1959 to 1971.

References

1982 deaths
1899 births
Republican Party members of the Washington House of Representatives
20th-century American politicians